Elias Ambühl (born 26 March 1992) is a Swiss freestyle skier. He was born in Masein.  He completed  1st in April 2011 at the Jon Olsson Invitational, he is the first skier to win with a triple cork. 
He competed in slopestyle at the FIS Freestyle World Ski Championships 2013. 

Ambühl competed for Switzerland in slopestyle at the 2014 Winter Olympics in Sochi, finishing 22nd. He competed again at the 2018 Winter Olympics in PyeongChang, where he qualified for the slopestyle final along with two fellow Swiss skiers and finished a much improved 9th.

References

External links

1992 births
Living people
Swiss male freestyle skiers
Freestyle skiers at the 2014 Winter Olympics
Freestyle skiers at the 2018 Winter Olympics
Olympic freestyle skiers of Switzerland
X Games athletes
21st-century Swiss people